Gullfjellet (Gold Mountain) is a Norwegian film from 1941 based on Guldfjeldet, a comedy by Ove Ansteinsson about farmers tempted to invest all their money in a gold bonanza. The film was directed by Rasmus Breistein and Titus Vibe-Müller.

Plot
The city boy Rolf Rønne arrives at Benningstad, a large farm in Hedemark, and gets to work. He meets Jørgen Krullerstugun and lies that he has found gold at Kråkberget, which is on Hans Benningstad's property. Jørgen makes his own investigations at Kråkberget and finds mica and mistakes it for gold. At night, he brings home large quantities of the stone and fills his living room and bedrooms. As rumors spread, purchasing bids start pouring in. The landowner does not want to sell, but he gives up when the gold find is announced in the newspapers. The bank manager and lawyer want to form a company with the village. Hans Benningstad becomes the director general and is now living the good life. Gold fever spreads, and several farmers sell their farms to buy gold mining shares. The village celebrates while the grain rots. Karl Kanten goes to Oslo to sell the gold to the bank, but he is told that it is only gray stone. The news shatters the celebratory mood at Benningstad when he returns the next day. The bank has to foreclose, and several farmers go bankrupt. Eventually, the farmers have to start farming again.

Reception
Aftenposten wrote that the film had many bright spots, but that the script was too weak. "There are many good things in Gullfjellet; the lines often contradict each other as they may in an active film, the camera moves too quickly, and in many places one has the feeling that the will to make a fresh film was present more than in others. But they were too indulgent toward the screenplay writer and did not cut enough ...."

References

External links
 
 Gullfjellet at the National Library of Norway

Norwegian black-and-white films
1941 films
Norwegian comedy films
1940s Norwegian-language films
1941 comedy films
Films directed by Rasmus Breistein
Films directed by Titus Vibe-Müller